Ulla Patrikka (born 10 April 1946) is a Finnish former backstroke swimmer. She competed in two events at the 1968 Summer Olympics.

References

External links
 

1946 births
Living people
Finnish female backstroke swimmers
Olympic swimmers of Finland
Swimmers at the 1968 Summer Olympics
Sportspeople from Jyväskylä
20th-century Finnish women